Royalmont Academy is a private PK–12 Catholic school located in Mason, Ohio, United States. The non-diocesan school is located within the Archdiocese of Cincinnati. Royalmont is divided into a half-day and all-day preschool, a kindergarten–8th grade division, and the Royalmont Academy Classical Preparatory High School. , 106 students are enrolled at Royalmont, including 50 in the high school division, plus 17 in the preschool.

History
Royalmont Academy was founded in Cincinnati's Oakley neighborhood in 1996. The school moved to Church Street in Mason in 1998, then to Western Row Road in 2002. On July 28, 2012, the school moved to its present location at the former Mason Heights Elementary School. Royalmont purchased the campus from Mason City School District on July 17, 2014, for $1 million. That year, Royalmont added a college-preparatory high school division, the first Catholic high school to open in the area since Badin High School opened in 1966.

References

External links
Royalmont Academy official webpage

Private schools in Cincinnati
High schools in Warren County, Ohio
Catholic secondary schools in Ohio
Roman Catholic Archdiocese of Cincinnati
Educational institutions established in 1996
1996 establishments in Ohio
Catholic elementary schools in Ohio
Elementary schools in Warren County, Ohio